Maja Simanić (born February 8, 1980) is a volleyball player from Serbia, playing as a setter. She was a member of the Women's National Team that won the silver medal at the 2007 European Championship in Belgium and Luxembourg. At the 2006 FIVB Women's World Championship she claimed the bronze medal with Serbia.

References
 FIVB profile

1980 births
Living people
Serbian women's volleyball players
Volleyball players at the 2008 Summer Olympics
Olympic volleyball players of Serbia
Serbian expatriate sportspeople in Romania
21st-century Serbian women